Kuwaykat, also spelled Kuweikat, Kweikat or Kuwaikat, was a Palestinian village located 9 km northeast of Acre. It was depopulated in 1948.

History
The old khan (caravansary) in Kuwaykat possibly dated to the Crusader period or an earlier date. According to historian Denys Pringle, the khan might have been part of the headquarters of Genoese estate in the village built in the 13th century. It consisted of a round barrel-vaulted building made of ashlar.

In 1245 the western part of Kuwaykat was owned by the Church and Hospital of St Thomas the Martyr in Acre.

Ottoman era

In the late Ottoman period,  Kuwaykat  was named Chiouwe chiateh on the French map Pierre Jacotin made of the area during Napoleon's invasion of Egypt and Syria in 1799. In 1875 Victor Guérin visited, and found the village surrounded with gardens planted with fig and olive trees, and with an ancient well. He further noted that the village was mentioned in Crusader sources. In 1881 Kuwaykat was described by the PEF's Survey of Western Palestine as being built of stone and situated at the foot of hills. The roughly 300 Muslim residents cultivated olives. In 1887, an elementary school was built in the village. In addition, the village had a mosque and a shrine for the Druze religious leader, Shaykh Aby Muhammad al-Qurayshi.

A population list from about 1887 showed that   Kiryet et Kuweikat had about 565 inhabitants; all Muslims.

British Mandate period
In the 1922 census of Palestine conducted by the British Mandate authorities, Kuaikat  had a population of 604; all Muslims,  increasing in the 1931 census to 789, still all Muslims,  in  a total of 163 houses.

In April 1938, during the Arab revolt in Palestine, a group of Palestinian Arab rebels planted a mine on the road near Kuwaykat which blew up a British vehicle, killing nine soldiers (according to the Arabs) or one soldier and wounding two others (according to the British). A rebel leader in Kuwaykat, Fayyad Baytam, was approached by the regional rebel commander Shaykh Amhad al-Tuba, who ordered him to plant the explosive on the road. Baytam refused, arguing that planting the bomb would only inevitably bring retaliation upon the village. Two local rebels, Al-Tuba and Ali Hummada, planted the explosive instead. The British Army proceeded to start setting houses in Kafr Yasif ablaze in response, but were then informed by local residents that the inhabitants of Kuwaykat were responsible for the attack. The British troops fatally shot nine Arabs as they approached the village. 

The land of Kuwaykat was considered to be among the most fertile of the district. Grain, olives and watermelons were its chief crops. In 1944/45 a total of 3,316 dunums were used for cereals, and 1,246 dunums were irrigated or used for orchards, of which 500 dunums were planted with olive trees, while 26 dunams were built-up (urban) area. The villagers also engaged in livestock breeding and dairy production. The village had a population of 1,050.

1948 War and aftermath

The first attack on the village of Kuwaykat during the 1948 Arab–Israeli War took place on 18–19 January 1948, and involved a force of over eighty Jewish militiamen, according to Filastin, the Palestinian newspaper at the time. The attack was repulsed, as was another attack on the village on the night of 6–7 February.  The village was finally depopulated during a military assault by Israel's Sheva' Brigade and Carmeli Brigade, as part of Operation Dekel. On the night of 9 July, at the start of the offensive, the village came under heavy bombardment. Villagers interviewed in 1973 in the refugee camp of Bourj el-Barajneh in Lebanon recalled: We were awakened by the loudest noise we had ever heard, shells exploding and artillery fire [..] women were screaming, children were crying...Most of the villagers began to flee with their pajamas on. The wife of Qassim Ahmad Sa´id fled carrying a pillow in her arms instead of her child ...Nazzal, 1978, pp. 72-73 Two people were killed and two wounded by the shelling. Many villagers fled to Abu Snan, Kafr Yasif and other villages that later surrendered. Those, mostly elderly, villagers who remained in Kuwaykat, were soon expelled to Kafr Yasif.

In January 1949, kibbutz ha-Bonim (later renamed Beit HaEmek) was established near the site of Kuwaykat, on village lands. Its settlers were Jewish immigrants from England, Hungary and the Netherlands. The Palestinian historian Walid Khalidi described the village in 1992: Little remains of the village except the deserted cemetery, completely overgrown with weeds, and rubble from houses. Inscriptions on two of the graves identify one as that of Hamad 'Isa al-Hajj, and another as that of Shaykh Salih Iskandar, who died in 1940. The shrine of Shaykh Abu Muhammad al-Qurayshi still stands but its stone pedestal is badly cracked.

See also
Depopulated Palestinian locations in Israel
List of villages depopulated during the Arab-Israeli conflict

Footnotes

Bibliography

External links
 Welcome to Kuwaykat Palestine Remembered
 Kuwaykat,  Zochrot
Survey of Western Palestine, Map 3:  IAA, Wikimedia commons 
Kuwaykat from the Khalil Sakakini Cultural Center
Al-Kweikat Dr. Moslih Kanaaneh
 -Raneen Geries 6.9.2008, Zochrot

District of Acre
Arab villages depopulated during the 1948 Arab–Israeli War